The 12th Airlift Flight is an inactive United States Air Force unit.

As the 12th Troop Carrier Squadron it served with the 322d Air Division stationed at Dreux-Louvilliers Air Base, France, where it was inactivated on 8 January 1961.

History

World War II

Established as part of the Army Air Corps in January 1938 at Olmsted Field, Pennsylvania but not activated until 1 December 1940. Not equipped or manned.   Unit designation transferred to Westover Field, Massachusetts, but not equipped or manned until after the Pearl Harbor Attack.   Equipped with Douglas C-47 Skytrain transports and trained for combat resupply and casualty evacuation mission.

Was ordered deployed to England, assigned to Eighth Air Force in June 1942.  Performed intra-theater transport flights of personnel, supply and equipment within England during summer and fall of 1942, reassigned to Twelfth Air Force after Operation Torch invasion of North Africa, stationed at Tafaraoui Airfield, Algeria.    In combat, performed resupply and evacuation missions across Morocco, Algeria and Tunisia during North African Campaign.  During June 1943, the unit began training with gliders in preparation for Operation Husky, the invasion of Sicily.  It towed gliders to Syracuse, Sicily and dropped paratroopers at Catania during the operation.  After moving to Sicily, the squadron airdropped supplies to escaped prisoners of war in Northern Italy in October. Operated from Sicily until December until moving to Italian mainland in December.

Supported Italian Campaign during balance of 1944 supporting partisans in the Balkans.  Its unarmed aircraft flew at night over uncharted territory, landing at small unprepared airfields to provide guns, ammunition, clothing, medical supplies, gasoline, and mail to the partisans.  It even carried jeeps and mules as cargo.  On return trips it evacuated wounded partisans, evadees and escaped prisoners.  These operations earned the squadron the Distinguished Unit Citation.  It also dropped paratroopers at Megava, Greece in October 1944 and propaganda leaflets in the Balkans in the Mediterranean Theater of Operations until end of combat in Europe, May, 1945.

After hostilities ended, was transferred to Waller Field, Trinidad attached to the Air Transport Command Transported personnel and equipment from Brazil to South Florida along the South Atlantic Air Transport Route.  Squadron picked up personnel and equipment in Brazil or bases in Northern South America with final destination being Miami, Boca Raton Army Airfield or Morrison Fields in South Florida.

European service

Was reassigned to the United States Air Forces in Europe (USAFE), September 1946, performing intro-theater cargo flights based at Munich Air Base.   Transferred to Kaufbeuren Air Base when Munich Air Base became a civilian airport. Was re-equipped with Douglas C-54 Skymaster aircraft and deployed to RAF Fassberg during 1948 Berlin Airlift.  Flew continuous missions across hostile Soviet Zone of Germany in Berlin Air Corridor, transporting supplies and equipment to airports in West Berlin, 1948-1949.  Later operated from Rhein-Main Air Base and Wiesbaden Air Base in American Zone of Occupation, later part of West Germany, until blockade ended. Remained as part of USAFE until 1961, being upgraded to Fairchild C-82 Packet and later Fairchild C-119 Flying Boxcar transports as part of USAFE 322d Air Division based in West Germany and France.  Inactivated as part of downsizing of USAFE bases in France, 1961.

Executive airlift
The squadron was redesignated the 12th Airlift Flight and activated at Langley Air Force Base in May 1993. It was equipped with C-21 Learjets to provide airlift for high ranking officers of Air Combat Command and other headquarters in the Norfolk-Hampron Roads area.  In 1997, this mission was transferred to Air Mobility Command.  The flight continued the mission until it was inactivated at the end of July 2005.

Lineage
 Constituted as the 12th Transport Squadron on 1 January 1938
 Activated on 1 December 1940
 Redesignated 12th Troop Carrier Squadron on 5 July 1942
 Inactivated on 31 July 1945
 Activated on 30 September 1946
 Redesignated: 12th Troop Carrier Squadron, Medium on 1 July 1948
 Redesignated: 12th Troop Carrier Squadron, Heavy on 5 November 1948
 Redesignated: 12th Troop Carrier Squadron, Medium on 16 November 1949
 Discontinued and inactivated on 8 January 1961
 Redesignated 12th Airlift Flight on 1 April 1993
 Activated on 1 May 1993
 Inactivated on 31 July 2005

Assignments
 60th Transport Group (later 60th Troop Carrier) Group), 1 December 1940 – 31 July 1945
 60th Troop Carrier Group, 30 September 1946
 60th Troop Carrier Wing, 12 March 1957
 322d Air Division, 25 September 1958 – 8 January 1961
 1st Operations Group, 1 May 1993
 457th Airlift Squadron, 1 April 1997 – 31 July 2005

Stations

 Olmsted Field, Pennsylvania, 1 December 1940
 Mitchel Field, New York, 20 May 1941
 Westover Field, Massachusetts, 16 December 1941 – 20 May 1942
 RAF Chelveston (Sta 105), England, 10 June 1942
 RAF Aldermaston (Sta 467), England, 7 August 1942
 Tafaraoui Airfield, Algeria, 8 November 1942
 Relizane Airfield, Algeria, 30 November 1942
 Thiersville Airfield, Algeria, 20 May 1943
 El Diem Airfield, Tunisia, 29 June 1943
 Ponte Olivo Airfield, Sicily, Italy, 6 September 1943 (operated from Comiso Airfield, Sicily after 22 October 1943)
 Gerbini Airfield, Sicily, Italy, 9 November 1943
 Brindisi Airfield, Italy, c. 29 March 1944

 Pomigliano Airfield, Italy, 7 October 1944 – May 1945
 Waller Field, Trinidad, 4 June – 31 July 1945
 Rhein-Main Air Base, Germany, 30 September 1946
 Munich Air Base, Germany, 1 November 1946
 Tempelhof Air Base, Germany, 5 May 1947
 Rhein-Main Air Base, Germany, 20 January 1948
 Kaufbeuren Air Base, Germany, 17 April 1948
 Wiesbaden Air Base, Germany, 24 December 1948
 Rhein-Main Air Base Germany, 26 September 1949
 Wiesbaden Air Base, Germany, 20 October 1949
 Rhein-Main Air Base, Germany, 7 July 1950
 Dreux Air Base, France, 13 September 1955 – 8 January 1961
 Langley Air Force Base, Virginia, 1 May 1993 – 31 July 2005

Aircraft
 Douglas C-47 Skytrain, 1942–1945; 1946–1948
 Douglas C-54 Skymaster, 1948–1949
 Fairchild C-82 Packet, 1949–1953
 Fairchild C-119 Flying Boxcar, 1953–1960
 Gates Learjet C-21 Learjet, 1997-2005

References

Notes

Bibliography

External links

012